The New Zealand Land Transport Management Amendment Act 2008 came into force on 1 August 2008.

One of its outcomes was the merging of Transit New Zealand and Land Transport New Zealand to form the NZ Transport Agency.

References

External links
New Zealand Parliament page
Text of the Act

Statutes of New Zealand
Transport law in New Zealand
2008 in New Zealand law
History of transport in New Zealand
2008 in transport
Transport legislation